Shaka Rock is the third studio album by Australian rock band Jet. It was released on 21 August 2009 by Virgin Records.

History
The band began working on the album in 2008. After touring was completed for their previous album, Shine On, the band took a short break. The album was originally thought to be released in late 2008 but a secret show was played in Melbourne in December 2008 only to debut new material. Various tracks from the album were played at this concert, including the first single "She's a Genius". In an interview with MTV's Ruby Rose on Channel 10's 7PM Project, it was said two unnamed tracks were recorded in Australia, one in Melbourne and one in Sydney. The album was posted on 20 August 2009 on the band's MySpace page.

The track "K.I.A (Killed in Action)" was added to Jet's website in early April 2009. Altsounds.com first reported on the album in late April 2009—drawing on information from the leaked press kit and providing the image of the album cover.

Reception

Shaka Rock was met with "mixed or average" reviews from critics. At Metacritic, which assigns a weighted average rating out of 100 to reviews from mainstream publications, this release received an average score of 51 based on 9 reviews.

Q rated "K.I.A" in the Q50 for September 2009 and the album as a whole fell just outside the magazine's best fifty albums of the year. The record has been made Entertainment Weekly Picks of The Week for 23 August.

Track listing

Personnel
 Nic Cester – vocals (1–11), guitar (1–5, 7–12), percussion (2, 6, 7), backing vocals (6, 12), acoustic guitar (6, 8), fuzz guitar (6), Arp keys (7), wah-wah (11)
 Chris Cester – drums, percussion (1–3, 5, 6, 8, 9, 11), vocals (1, 2, 8), backing vocals (5, 7, 9), samples (1), smashing glass (8)
 Cameron Muncey – guitar (1–11), backing vocals (2, 5, 7, 8, 9, 11), 12-string guitar (7), vibraphone (11), lead vocals (12), slide guitar (12), Acoustic Guitar (12)
 Mark Wilson – bass (1–7, 9–12), samples (2, 3), backing vocals (2, 9), synthesizer (4, 5), piano (5, 12), fuzz bass (8)

Additional musicians
 Chris Smith – guitar (1, 3, 12), Hammond M1 (7), tremolo guitar (7), backing vocals (9)
 Troupe Gammage – piano (5, 6, 8)
 Brooks Johnson – vocals (1)
 Ella Stovall – vocals (1)
 Josie Johnson – vocals (1)
 Theo Tolan – vocals (1)
 Samantha May – vocals (1)
 Caroline Pollan – vocals (1)
 Hanna Rimel – vocals (1)
 Asia Biddle – vocals (1)
 Matthew Beck – vocals (1)
 Drew Eno – vocals (1)
 Meimei Graber – vocals (1)
 Alex Clark – vocals (1)
 John Clark – vocals (1)
 Madelyn Rimel – vocals (1)
 Lane Loudamy – vocals (1)
 Jonathan Shim – snare drum (1)
 Rannon Ching – snare drum (1)
 Blake Brunson – bass drum (1)
 Jeremy Burchard – tenor drums (1)
 James King – saxophone (3)
 Ian McLagan – Hammond B3 (7)
 Georgia Gutjahr – backing vocals (9)
 Allie Freeland – backing vocals (9)
 Clea Freeland – backing vocals (9)
 Louis Macklin – piano (10)
 Lukas Haas – Rhodes piano (12)

Charts

Certifications

Release history

References

2009 albums
Jet (band) albums
Virgin Records albums
Albums produced by Chris "Frenchie" Smith